Arny Freeman (August 28, 1908 —February 13, 1986) was a Chicago-born American character actor. He appeared in commercials, television series episodes, Broadway plays, and motion pictures; he was also credited as Arnie Freeman and as Arnold Freeman. He was interviewed in Studs Terkel’s Working and appeared in the Broadway musical adaptation of the book.

Television credits
Among the television series in which he appeared are Naked City (1958, 1959 and 1961 [two episodes]), NBC Friday Night Special Presentation (1959's "Miracle on 34th Street"), Have Gun, Will Travel (1961), The Untouchables (1961, 1962), Kojak (1975), Maude (1976), The Jeffersons (1976), Barnaby Jones (1977), All in the Family (1977), The Incredible Hulk (1978) and Barney Miller (in 6 episodes, 1976 to 1981).

Movie credits
Freeman appeared in feature films, including Phffft! (1954), The Brain That Wouldn't Die (1962), Popi (1969), The Valachi Papers (1972) and The Super Cops (1974).

Filmography

References

External links
 

1908 births
1986 deaths
Male actors from Chicago
20th-century American male actors
American male film actors
American male stage actors
American male television actors